Gennaro Olivieri (February 10, 1942 – January 27, 2020) was an Italian professional football player and coach.

He played for 5 seasons (93 games, 1 goal) in the Serie A for SPAL 1907 and A.S. Roma.

References

External links
 Career summary by playerhistory.com

1942 births
2020 deaths
Italian footballers
Serie A players
S.S. Juve Stabia players
S.P.A.L. players
A.S. Roma players
A.C. Perugia Calcio players
U.S. Salernitana 1919 players
Italian football managers
Reggina 1914 managers
Association football defenders